The 1920 United States presidential election in New Mexico took place on November 2, 1920. All contemporary forty-eight States were part of the 1920 United States presidential election. Voters chose three electors to represent them in the Electoral College, which voted for President and Vice President.

Background
During the period between New Mexico's annexation by the United States and statehood, the area was divided between largely Republican machine-run highland regions and its firmly Southern Democrat and Baptist "Little Texas" region to the southeast. A split in the "Old Guard" of highland Republicanism meant that in the state's inaugural presidential election in 1912 Woodrow Wilson carried the state through overwhelming "Little Texas" and southern desert support over Progressive Theodore Roosevelt and incumbent Republican William Howard Taft. Four years later in 1916, Wilson gained sufficient Progressive support to narrowly hold the state against Charles Evans Hughes and the reunited Republican Party; however, in 1918, despite extremely low turnout due to the Spanish flu epidemic the reunited GOP regained considerable strength.

The following two years saw the Democratic Party's prospects decline still further due to skyrocketing inflation helping make President Wilson very unpopular – besides which the President also had major health problems that had left First Lady Edith effectively running the nation. Political unrest observed in the Palmer Raids and the "Red Scare" further added to the unpopularity of the Democratic Party, since this global political turmoil produced considerable fear of alien revolutionaries invading the country. However, owing to its Anglo population's ties to the Southern United States, New Mexico was not nearly so isolationist as Appalachia or the Midwest, but the state's farmers did come to believe that the old Confederacy was gaining preferential treatment – to its disadvantage – from the Democratic administration.

Vote
Neither Harding nor Cox campaigned in this electoral-vote-poor state; however, a powerful group of corporate Republicans campaigned extensively for Harding, as did Senator Albert Fall, who was a very close associate of the President-to-be. The corporate and "Old Guard" Republicans campaigned on a "Return to Normalcy" following World War I and the tumult of the Bolshevik Revolution and attempts to spread it across Europe.

New Mexico was won by Ohio Senator Warren G. Harding, in a strong 10-percentage-point sweep against Ohio Governor James M. Cox. Despite this victory, New Mexico was still sixteen percentage points more Democratic than the nation at-large, because the internationalist and traditionally Democratic Plains regions remained extremely loyal to Cox, and Fall's campaign in urban Bernalillo County was so ineffective that that county actually swung 4 percentage points towards the Democrats amidst a national 29-percentage-point swing.

Results

Results by county

References

New Mexico
1920 New Mexico elections
1920